The 1973 Coliseum Mall International, also known as the Hampton Indoor, was a men's tennis tournament played on indoor carpet courts at the Hampton Roads Coliseum in Hampton, Virginia in the United States that was part of the 1973 USLTA Indoor Circuit. It was the fourth edition of the tournament and was held from February 26 through March 3, 1973. First-seeded U.S. player Jimmy Connors won the singles title and earned $10,000 first-prize money.

Finals

Singles

 Jimmy Connors defeated  Ilie Năstase 4–6, 6–3, 7–5, 6–3
 It was Connors' 5th singles title of the year and the 11th of his career.

Doubles

 Clark Graebner /  Ilie Năstase defeated  Jimmy Connors /  Ion Ţiriac 6–2, 6–1

References

External links
 ITF tournament edition details

National Indoor Championships
National Indoor Championships
National Indoor Championships
1973 in sports in Virginia